This article details the Castleford Tigers's rugby league football club's 2020 season.

Fixtures and results 
  

All fixtures are subject to change

Challenge Cup

Regular season

League standings

Discipline

 Red Cards

  Yellow Cards

Player statistics

As of 1 November 2020

2020 squad

2020 transfers 
Gains

Losses

Notes

References

External links 
 

Castleford Tigers seasons
Super League XXV by club